The Fehmarn Belt fixed link or Fehmarn Belt tunnel is an under-construction immersed tunnel, which will connect the Danish island of Lolland with the German island of Fehmarn, crossing the  Fehmarn Belt in the Baltic Sea.

It will provide a direct link between northern Germany and Lolland, and from there to the Danish island of Zealand and Copenhagen, becoming the world's longest road and rail tunnel. The tunnel will be a major connection between central Europe and Scandinavia. It will shorten the travel time between Lolland and Fehmarn from 45 minutes by ferry (excluding waiting and boarding time) to 10 minutes by car and seven minutes by train. The electrified high-speed rail line will be capable of reaching .

The project's cost was initially estimated at €5.5 billion. By 2010, when Denmark and Germany signed the treaty to build the bridge, this had grown to €7.4 billion. The tunnel will be financed by Denmark, which will collect a toll from the crossing. Germany will pay a further €800 million to connect the crossing to its motorway network.

The tunnel will replace a heavily travelled ferry service from Rødby and Puttgarden, currently operated by Scandlines, a route known in German as the Vogelfluglinie and in Danish as Fugleflugtslinjen.

Fehmarn is connected with the German mainland by the Fehmarn Sound Bridge, and Lolland is connected by a tunnel and bridges with Zealand via the island of Falster. Zealand in turn is connected with the Swedish mainland via the Øresund Bridge. There is also a fixed connection between Zealand and Germany via the Great Belt Bridge to Funen and Jutland. The Fehmarnbelt tunnel is expected to be completed in 2029.

History

Bridge proposal
Since 1963, the German island of Fehmarn has been connected to the mainland through the Fehmarn Sound Bridge. Since then, connection to the Danish island of Lolland has been provided by a regular ferry service across the strait. This started the discussion on a fixed link across the strait. By the late 1990s feasibility studies had been carried out for constructing a bridge. Ideas involved a bridge carrying both a four-lane motorway and two electrified rail tracks. This solution was for years regarded as the most likely scheme and detailed plans were drawn up. The Fehmarn Belt bridge was originally expected to be completed by 2018.

However, in late 2010, after further feasibility studies, the Danish project planners declared that an immersed tunnel would instead present fewer construction risks and would cost about the same.

The design of the bridge links was being carried out by the Dissing+Weitling company for its aesthetical features and by the COWI and Obermeyer companies for their civil engineering aspects. The proposed design would have carried four motorway lanes and two railway tracks.

Tunnel solution
Although originally conceived as a bridge, Femern A/S (the Danish state-owned company tasked with designing and planning the link) announced in December 2010 that a tunnel was preferable, and the tunnel idea received support from a large majority of the Danish Parliament in January 2011. By 2012, therefore, the completion date had been pushed back to 2021, and in 2014, it was estimated to be 2024, and then in 2015, it got delayed further to 2028. In 2020, it was delayed to 2029.

In February 2015, the draft bill for the construction was introduced to the Danish parliament, and the Danish Government submitted an application for DKK 13 billion (€1.7 billion) in EU grants, supported by Germany and Sweden. In June 2015, €589 million of EU funding was awarded to Denmark by the European Commission under its Connecting Europe Facility (CEF) scheme, allowing the tunnel project to go ahead. In March 2017, the operating company announced the sign-up of subcontractors for the project.

 On 13 December 2018, the European Court ruled in favour of Scandlines in case T‑630/15 regarding state aid.

The commission has claimed on 28 September 2018, that there has been no unlawful aid. Action regarding this has been brought before court in January 2019, case number T-7/19.

Project 
This project is comparable in size to that of the Øresund Bridge or the Great Belt Bridge. According to a report released on 30 November 2010 by Femern A/S (a subsidiary of the Danish state-owned Sund & Bælt Holding A/S), the company tasked with designing and planning the link between Denmark and Germany, the corridor for the alignment of the link has now been determined and will be sited in a corridor running east of the ferry ports of Puttgarden and Rødbyhavn.

The Fehmarn Belt Fixed Link and its double-tracks will shorten the rail journey from Hamburg to Copenhagen from four hours and 58 minutes to three hours and 15 minutes. According to current plans there will be one passenger train and two freight trains in each direction per hour. The narrow Fehmarn Sound Bridge will be replaced by a new Fehmarn Sound Tunnel with a four-lane motorway and double-track railway.

Design 
The tunnel will consist of 79 standard elements with a length of 217 metres in a design similar to the Drogden trench, with two road tubes, one emergency tube and two rail tubes. Additionally, there will be 10 service elements with a length of 85.7 metres but both wider and higher with a subfloor (basement) to house technical equipment.

Financing 
When the Danish Folketing (parliament) ratified the project in March 2009, its cost was estimated at 42 billion DKK (€5 billion). This cost included €1.5 billion for other improvements such as electrifying and improving  of railway from single-track to double-track on the Danish side. In 2011 this was increased to a total of €5.5 billion (at 2008 prices). On top of this there will be cost of at least €1 billion for the German rail connection which will be paid by the German government.

The Fehmarn Belt Fixed Link will be financed by state-guaranteed loans, which will be paid by the road and train tolls. Denmark will be solely responsible for guaranteeing the funding of the project at an estimated cost of 35 billion kroner or (€4.7 billion) and German participation will be limited to the development of the land-based facilities on the German side. The government of Denmark will own the fixed link outright, will be allowed to keep tolls after the loans have been repaid, and will enjoy any employment opportunities at the toll station. The fees are also planned to pay for the Danish railway upgrading.

On the German side, the road will be upgraded to four lanes and the railway to double track and, according to the treaty, paid by the German government without a toll for users.

The European Union has designated this project as one of the 30 prioritised transport infrastructure projects (TEN-T). 
It has committed to a   €600 million to  €1.2 billion subsidy. The project is expected to have 5% rate of return for Europe. Construction estimates covered the period from 1 April 1998 until 2021.

New Storstrømmen and Fehmarn Sound links 
Two new links are planned. According to the 2008 Danish–German treaty, the bridges did not have to be replaced, and the double-track railway construction in Germany may be delayed by up to seven years. Because of its bad condition, a replacement of the Storstrøm Bridge has been contracted and is slated for completion in 2026. The Schleswig-Holstein State Government announced in 2013 it envisioned the construction of a new Fehmarn Sound link or an upgrade of the current Fehmarn Sound Bridge, since it considered the current bridge – with two lanes for road traffic and one track for rail traffic – to be a bottleneck for the German hinterland connection. On 3 March 2020, the German Federal Ministry of Transport, the State of Schleswig-Holstein and Deutsche Bahn announced that a new 1.7 km long immersed Fehmarn Sound Tunnel (German: Fehmarnsundtunnel) with four road lanes and two rail tracks, costing approximately 714 million euros, is planned to be built by 2028, while the current bridge will be preserved for pedestrians, cyclists and slow road traffic.

Railway axis Fehmarn Belt 

The Fehmarn Belt Tunnel's railway is the central section of the 'Railway axis Fehmarn Belt', which is Priority Project 20 of the Trans-European Transport Network (TEN-T) that seeks to establish a high-speed rail line Copenhagen–Hamburg. In the north, it connects to the Øresund Bridge/Drogden Tunnel (Priority Project 11) and the Nordic Triangle railway/road axis (Priority Project 12), and in the south to Bremen and Hanover. The full line currently under construction consists of several new railways to be built and old railways to be upgraded, to achieve at least a maximum speed of 200 km/h on all sections:
 Copenhagen–Ringsted Line, opened on 31 May 2019, currently operating at 180 km/h, upgrading to 250 km/h in 2023.
 Sydbanen (Ringsted–Rødbyhavn), new tracks to be laid by 2021, to be electrified to reach 200 km/h by 2024.
 Fehmarn Belt Tunnel (Rødbyhavn–Puttgarden), 200 km/h, to be completed in 2028. (since revised)
 Puttgarden–Lübeck railway, to be electrified and upgraded to reach 200 km/h up from the current 100–160 km/h. The new Fehmarn Sound Tunnel (to be completed in 2028) is part of this section.
 Lübeck–Hamburg railway, to be upgraded to reach 200 km/h.

Tunnel characteristics
Immersion involves dredging a trench across the seafloor, laying a foundation bed of sand or gravel, and then lowering precast concrete tunnel sections into the excavation and covering it with a protective layer of backfill several metres thick.

The Fehmarn Belt is planned to be crossed by an immersed tunnel. At the planned , it will be the longest ever constructed, and will surpass the   Marmaray Tunnel of the Bosphorus, Turkey. On 30 November 2010, Denmark's Femern A/S project manager announced it had selected immersed tunnel design submitted by the Ramboll, Arup, and TEC consortium. According to the senior project managers, as well as being the world's longest immersed tunnel, it will be the "world's longest combined road and rail tunnel; the world's longest under water tunnel for road; the deepest immersed tunnel with road and rail traffic; and the second deepest concrete immersed tunnel." The size of the project is about five times the tunnel part of the Øresund Link between Denmark and Sweden, currently the "longest immersed concrete tunnel."

Arguments brought forward in favour of a tunnel include its starkly reduced environmental impact, its independence from weather conditions, as crosswinds can have considerable impact on trucks and trailers, especially on a north–south bridge. A bored tunnel was deemed too expensive.

The single-level, sectional arrangement of the two road and rail tubes side-by-side – with the road west and the railway east – coincide with the arrangement of the existing road and rail infrastructure, and requires no weaving to connect.

Project history

 On 29 June 2007, an interim agreement was reached in Berlin between the Danish and German authorities (represented by their transport ministers) to proceed with the construction of the fixed link. Construction would start in 2015 and was expected to be completed by the end of 2021.
 On 3 September 2008, the ministers of transportation from Denmark and Germany, Carina Christensen and Wolfgang Tiefensee, signed the treaty for the construction of the Fehmarn Belt Fixed Link at a ceremony held in Copenhagen. 
 On 26 March 2009, the construction was ratified by the Danish Parliament. 
 On 18 June 2009, the construction was approved by the German Parliament.
 In December 2010, it was announced that a tunnel would be used rather than a bridge, as this would present fewer construction risks than a cable-stayed bridge that would be pushing the limits of the technology. The cost and the construction time would be roughly the same.
 In January 2011, a large majority of the parties in the Danish Parliament voted to support a tunnel solution. However, national approval procedures in both countries needed to be completed and, in Germany, this involved the application for a plan approval process. In Denmark, the project would require the passage in Parliament of a Construction Act.
 On 16 December 2011, the German Government announced it was postponing development of the railway link to the Fehmarn Tunnel until after 2015. According to a report in Der Nordschleswiger, German Traffic Minister Peter Ramsauer decided to reduce planned government investment in new infrastructure in Germany by 25 per cent due to the economic crisis. It was not immediately clear what effect the postponement would have on the overall Fehmarn Belt Fixed Link project.
 In October 2013, the tunnel company applied to German authorities for approval according to environmental law and other laws of Germany and EU. This was rejected in 2015 because new legislation that appeared in the meantime was not accounted for.
 On 25 February 2015, the bill for the Construction Act for the Fehmarn belt link was introduced in the Danish Parliament.
 On 26 February 2015, the Danish Ministry of Transport submitted an application for an EU grant of DKK 13 billion (€1.7 billion) for the project's construction phase. The application was accompanied by letters of support from the Swedish Minister for Infrastructure, Anna Johansson, and the German Transport Minister, Alexander Dobrindt. In addition, the German State Government of Schleswig-Holstein, as well as a wide range of business organisations from the Danish, Swedish, and German sides, sent statements supporting the application. EU finally approved DKK 6.92 billion in total for the tunnel and the connecting Danish railway, around 15% of the cost. 

 On 13 June 2016, the tunnel company applied again to German authorities for approval, based on an updated application of 11,000 pages adopted to new legal principles that appeared since last application. It is expected that this process is ended in 2018. It expected that two further years will be spent in court processes, since political objectors have stated they will appeal the authority approval.
 On 28 December 2018, the German authority decided to approve the project.
 On 6 February 2019, Femern A/S received German plan approval for the tunnel. This has been appealed to the Federal Administrative Court by political objectors.
 In February 2019, DB Netz AG submits a document to the BMVI detailing variants of the rail connection to the tunnel. The railway plans will need approval by the German Parliament.
 In March 2019, Femern A/S decided on Government request to start large preparatory work on land, such as building a factory for concrete tunnel elements., in anticipation of a positive German court decision later.
 On 3 March 2020, the German Federal Ministry of Transport, the State of Schleswig-Holstein and Deutsche Bahn announced that a new 1.7 km long immersed Fehmarn Sound Tunnel (German: Fehmarnsundtunnel) with four road lanes and two rail tracks, costing approximately €714 million, will be built by 2028, while the current Fehmarn Sound Bridge, which was at risk of becoming a bottleneck, will be preserved for pedestrians, cyclists and slow road traffic.
 On 30 April 2020, it was announced by Femern A/S that work is scheduled to begin on 1 January 2021, although it is possible that this will be delayed due to the effects of the COVID-19 pandemic. Femern has already begun a number of pre-construction activities at Puttgarden.
 On 3 November 2020, the Federal Administrative Court ruled that the project could be built, but some reefs would have to be considered. The Naturschutzbund Deutschland described it as a "dark day for the marine environment". Sabine Leidig (Die Linke) commented: "The ecological effects and the burden upon the neighbours of this giant project are much too large, compared to its small utility."
 On 1 January 2021, works began on the actual tunnel construction, with an official online ceremony.
 On 18 January 2022, the German Federal Administrative Court in Leipzig imposed a construction freeze on the areas near protected reefs, while it considered legal challenges from a group opposed to the project.
 On 12 May 2022, work has begun on the tunnel's northern entrance (Danish side).
 On 24 May 2022, the dredging work of the tunnel is 50% completed, i.e., 11 km has been dredged.
 On 14 December 2022, all complaints from political organisations were dismissed by the Federal Administrative Court in Leipzig.

Criticism
The crossing has been discussed for more than 30 years. At the beginning of that period, before the reunification of Germany, the only possible link was towards Hamburg, as going towards Communist East Germany was not a viable option. Although times have changed and Europe has been politically and economically reshaped in the meantime, the plans for the Fehmarn Belt Fixed Link have stayed the course. The Cold War era conceptualization of the Fehmarn Belt Fixed Link has been highly criticized, as some see connecting the two capitals of Copenhagen and Berlin and on a larger scale, a link from Scandinavia to the former Warsaw Pact countries as a priority of the utmost importance. A Gedser–Rostock Bridge, about  further east, has been proposed as an alternative or to complement the Fehmarn Belt Fixed Link, as this alternative proposal would better connect eastern Germany including Berlin and places further east and south with Scandinavia. 
Despite an offer to help offset the costs of the tunnel by the Danish Cyclists' Federation, it is not planned to include a cycle path.

There have been objections from local people on the German side, both from those fearing the loss of jobs in connection with the present busy ferry traffic, and from environmental protectionists who believed that wildlife would suffer from the construction of the originally conceived bridge. At the same time, employment connected to construction works would be only short-term, while residents  would suffer from the increase in traffic, especially with the planned freight trains which would move from the present Jutland-Great Belt Fixed Link route. In particular, there are concerns with the potential increase of train noise for some residents with moving the freight train traffic from the current route to this new route. These critics have been the loudest and they have been able to get a realignment of the planned railway route. The present Hamburg freight rail bypass used today for the freight traffic, is disturbing more people than the villages north of Lübeck.

Furthermore, it is claimed that the project might be economically unjustified, as predictions of passenger traffic and goods transport may be overestimated and there is a considerable risk that the investment will not be recouped.
The European Court of Auditors has criticised the planning of the German land connection for letting cost rise uncontrolled. This cost is more than double what would be if following the legal requirements for a 160 km/h railway (the originally decided speed). Local lobbyists have been allowed to get things such as realignment and extra noise protection.

In 2019, the Bundesrechnungshof commented that "in view of the current traffic forecasts, it is questionable whether the benefits of the project will increase to such an extent that the expected costs are justified under economic aspects".

Support 
There have been complaints from some Swedish politicians over long train travel times between Sweden and Germany, and the lack of night trains. This made train travel, for example from Stockholm to Brussels, impossible unless one night is spent in a hotel en route. The Fehmarn Belt Fixed Link would improve the travel time considerably.

In 2020, the Swedish Government decided to financially support international night trains from Stockholm to mainland Europe, one from Stockholm via Copenhagen to Hamburg, which began operations by SJ in September 2022, and another one from Malmö to Brussels, which was not bid for and did not commence. On top of these, there is a commercially operated night train from Stockholm to Berlin via Copenhagen and Hamburg, going in popular seasons, mainly summer time, which is operated by Snälltåget and started June 2021. Before 2021, a night train operated under various operators Malmö-Berlin (originally longer route) from 1909 to 2020 through the Trelleborg–Sassnitz ferry.

References

External links
 
  Femern Bælt, Danish traffic ministry
  Pictures, Danish traffic ministry
 
 Information on the Fehmarn Belt Fixed Link on the website of the Greens/EFA in the European Parliament
 Dynamic map comparing proposed bridge and tunnel routes
 Ramboll's Project Manager blogs about the tunnel
 Ramboll's project description of the tunnel
 Giraffe_(film)
 

Buildings and structures in Schleswig-Holstein
Railway tunnels in Denmark
Belt Fixed Link
Connections across the Baltic Sea
Toll tunnels in Europe
Immersed tube tunnels in Denmark
Immersed tube tunnels in Germany
2029 in rail transport